The 1937–38 season was the 64th season of competitive football by Rangers.

Overview

Results
All results are written with Rangers' score first.

Scottish League Division One

Scottish Cup

Appearances

See also
 1937–38 in Scottish football
 1937–38 Scottish Cup

Rangers F.C. seasons
Rangers